Lucy v. Adams, 350 U.S. 1 (1955), was a U.S. Supreme Court case that successfully established the right of all citizens to be accepted as students at the University of Alabama.

The case involved African American citizens Autherine Lucy and Polly Anne Myers, who were refused admission to the University of Alabama solely on account of their race or color.  

The Supreme Court affirmed the lower court decision, saying that it enjoins and restrains the respondent and others designated from denying these petitioners, solely on account of their race or color, the right to enroll in the University of Alabama and pursue courses of study there.

See also
List of United States Supreme Court cases, volume 350
 Sipuel v. Board of Regents of the University of Oklahoma
 Sweatt v. Painter
 McLaurin v. Oklahoma State Regents

External links
 

1955 in United States case law
United States Supreme Court cases
United States Supreme Court cases of the Warren Court
United States equal protection case law
United States school desegregation case law
University of Alabama
African-American history of Alabama
1955 in Alabama
Legal history of Alabama
Civil rights movement case law